The William Shaver House is a historic house on the east side of School Street, north of 4th Street, in Hardy, Arkansas.  It is a single story fieldstone structure, with a side gable roof and a projecting gable-roofed porch.  The porch is supported by stone columns with an elliptical arch, and a concrete base supporting a low stone wall.  The main facade is three bays wide, with the porch and entrance at the center, and flanking sash windows.  The house is a fine local example of a vernacular stone house, built c. 1947 for a working-class family.

The house was listed on the National Register of Historic Places in 1998.

See also
Fred Carter House, a nearby house built by the same builder around the same time
National Register of Historic Places listings in Sharp County, Arkansas

References

Houses on the National Register of Historic Places in Arkansas
Houses completed in 1947
Houses in Sharp County, Arkansas
National Register of Historic Places in Sharp County, Arkansas
1947 establishments in Arkansas